East Asian poetry may refer to:

 Chinese poetry
 Korean poetry
 Japanese poetry
 Vietnamese poetry